Hooray! It's a Deathtrip is the fourth album by Swedish rock band The Quill.

Track listing
"Spinning Around" – 4:39 
"Nothing Ever Changes" – 4:53 
"Come What May" – 4:02
"Too Close To The Sun" – 5:25
"Handful of Flies" – 4:59
"American Powder" – 3:55 
"Hammerhead" – 5:28 
"Giver" – 4:23 
"Man Posed" – 6:00 
"Because I'm God" – 3:16
"Control" – 5:14

Personnel

The Quill
 Magnus Ekwall - Vocals
 Christian Carlsson - Guitar
 Roger Nilsson - Bass
 George "Jolle" Atlagic - Drums

Additional personnel
 Hasse Carlsson - Sitar on "Handful of Flies"

References

External links
 Hooray! It's a Deathtrip at Encyclopaedia Metallum
 Hooray! It's a Deathtrip at Discogs

2003 albums
The Quill (band) albums